"Working Day and Night" is a song by American recording artist Michael Jackson. It is the third track from his fifth studio album, Off the Wall (1979). The song was written and produced by Jackson. Despite not being released as a single, Jackson performed the song live for his first two solo tours. It is also featured on the video game Michael Jackson: The Experience. The song has been sampled by several artists. It was remixed and released on the remix/soundtrack album, Immortal, in 2011. In 2014, producer Timbaland sampled percussion and breaths from the song in the duet version of "Love Never Felt So Good" (with Justin Timberlake); the duet was released as a single from Xscape.

Background 
"Working Day and Night" was written by Michael Jackson and recorded for his studio album Off the Wall issued in August 1979. The song was not released as a single, but as the B-side for "Rock with You" in the US, and B-side for "Off the Wall" in the UK. The song has a tempo of 128 beats per minute, making it one of Jackson's fastest songs.

Live performances 
"Working Day and Night" was performed by both of The Jacksons' tours, and two of Michael Jackson's first two world concert series tours as a solo artist.

The song was performed by The Jacksons' Triumph Tour in 1981 and Victory Tour in 1984. In Michael Jackson's solo tours, the song was performed live on the Bad World Tour from 1987-1989, and the first two legs of Dangerous World Tour in 1992. The song was rehearsed for third leg of Dangerous World Tour in 1993, but it was ultimately removed from the setlist.

A live version, recorded at one of The Jacksons' 1981 Madison Square Garden concerts, was included on live album, The Jacksons Live!, later edited and released as the album's second single in November 1981.  Record World said that "An energetic bass riff transports the exciting vocal interaction, while horn spice gives added radio appeal." In 2001, the original demo recording of the song was released as a bonus track on the expanded, special edition of Off the Wall. The live performance video at Jackson's Dangerous World Tour in Bucharest, Romania on October 1, 1992, was featured on the DVD in his box set The Ultimate Collection in 2004, and a live concert DVD, Live in Bucharest: The Dangerous Tour, in 2005. In 2012, a live audio and video version of the song performed during the Bad World Tour was released on the deluxe edition of Bad 25 and the concert DVD Live at Wembley July 16, 1988. The song was remixed and released on the soundtrack to Cirque du Soleil's Michael Jackson: The Immortal World Tour, Immortal, in 2011. This song has also been used for the Michael Jackson: One production.

Personnel 

 Written and composed by Michael Jackson
 Produced by Quincy Jones
 Co-produced by Michael Jackson
 Recorded and Mixed by Bruce Swedien
 Lead and background vocals: Michael Jackson
 Bass guitar: Louis Johnson
 Drums: John Robinson
 Guitars: David Williams and Phil Upchurch
 Acoustic and electric pianos, synthesizer: Greg Phillinganes

 Percussion: Paulinho Da Costa, John Robinson and Michael Jackson
 Horns arranged by Jerry Hey and performed by The Seawind Horns:
 Trumpet and flugelhorn: Jerry Hey
 Tenor, alto saxophones and flute: Larry Williams
 Baritone, tenor saxophones and flute: Kim Hutchcroft
 Trombone: William Reichenbach
 Trumpet: Gary Grant
 Rhythm arrangements by Greg Phillinganes and Michael Jackson
 Vocal and percussion arrangements by Michael Jackson

Official versions
 "Album Version" - 5:12
 "Original Demo from 1978" - 4:10
 "Immortal Version" - 3:36
 "Live at Triumph Tour" by The Jacksons - 6:53
 "Live at Wembley July 16, 1988" from the Bad World Tour, available in the deluxe edition of Bad 25 - 5:55

Covers and samples 
 In 1983, George Duke sampled this song for the "Overture" of the album Guardian of the Light.
 In 1999, Will Smith sampled this song on his track "Can You Feel Me" for his album Willennium.
 In 1989, Richie Rich sampled this song for his single "Salsa House", from the album I Can Make You Dance.
 In 2009, Michael's sister Janet Jackson sampled this song for her single "Make Me" from her greatest hits album Number Ones.
 In 2014, Timbaland sampled percussion and breaths from the song for the duet version of Jackson's posthumous song "Love Never Felt So Good", which features American recording artist Justin Timberlake for the record Xscape.

References 

1979 songs
Michael Jackson songs
Songs written by Michael Jackson
Song recordings produced by Michael Jackson
Song recordings produced by Quincy Jones
Disco songs